"Hot Shot" is a song performed by Cliff Richard and released as a single in October 1979. Written by Terry Britten and B. A. Robertson, it was the second single lifted from Richard's 1979 album Rock 'n' Roll Juvenile. It reached no. 46 in the UK Singles Chart.

Release
"Hot Shot" was released as the follow-up single to the international hit "We Don't Talk Anymore". However, it failed to repeat its success, failing to make the top 40 in the UK, peaking at number 46 and spending a total of five weeks in the top 75. It did, however, perform better in Ireland, peaking at number 27.

For the compilation album My Kinda Life – A Selection of 14 Great Songs 1992 Version, new instrumentation, recorded in April 1992, was added to an alternative take of the original song.

Track listings
7": EMI / EMI 5003
 "Hot Shot" – 3:23
 "Walking in the Light" – 3:17

Personnel
Cliff Richard – vocals, backing vocals
Terry Britten – guitar, backing vocals
Madelaine Bell – backing vocals
Herbie Flowers – bass
Graham Jarvis – drums, percussion
Billy Livsey – keyboards
Tristan Fry – percussion
Mel Collins – brass
Martin Drover – brass
Chris Mercer – brass

Chart performance

Cover versions
 In May 1980, BA Robertson released his own version as the B-side to "To Be or Not to Be". It was a live medley with "Language of Love", recorded in April 1980 at The Venue, London. "Language of Love" had also been first recorded by Richard for Rock 'n' Roll Juvenile.
 In 1981, Clout covered the song on their album A Threat and a Promise; however, it is incorrectly credited to Hall and Oates.

References

1979 songs
1979 singles
Cliff Richard songs
EMI Records singles
Songs written by Terry Britten
Songs written by BA Robertson